The 2012 Tour of Qatar was the eleventh edition of the Tour of Qatar cycling stage race. It was rated as a 2.HC event on the UCI Asia Tour, and was held between 5 and 10 February 2012, in Qatar.

The race was won for the fourth time by Belgium's Tom Boonen, of the  team, leading the race from start to finish and taking two stage victories along the way. Boonen's winning margin over runner-up Tyler Farrar – the winners of the team time trial stage near the Losail International Circuit – was 28 seconds, and 's Juan Antonio Flecha completed the podium, five seconds behind Farrar and 33 seconds down on Boonen. In the race's other classifications, Boonen also won the points classification, having held the lead of the standings from start to finish, Farrar's teammate Ramūnas Navardauskas won the white jersey for the youth classification, by placing eighth overall in the general classification, and  finished at the head of the teams classification.

Teams
Sixteen teams competed in the 2012 Tour of Qatar. These included eleven UCI ProTour teams, three UCI Professional Continental teams, and two Continental teams.

The teams that participated in the race were:

RTS Racing Team

Stages

Stage 1
5 February 2012 – Barzan Towers to College of the North Atlantic,

Stage 2
6 February 2012 – Losail,  team time trial (TTT)

Stage 3
7 February 2012 – Dukhan to Al-Gharafa Stadium,

Stage 4
8 February 2012 – Al Thakhira to Madinat ash Shamal,

Stage 5
9 February 2012 – Camel Race Track to Al Khor Corniche,

Stage 6
10 February 2012 – Sealine Beach Resort to Doha Corniche,

Classification leadership

References

External links

Tour of Qatar
Tour of Qatar
2012